Rajkumar Buyya is an Indian born Australian academic. As of 2022, he is distinguished professor and director of the Cloud Computing and Distributed Systems Laboratory at the University of Melbourne.

He was made a Fellow of the Institute of Electrical and Electronics Engineers (IEEE) in 2015 for contributions to cloud computing.

He published Content Delivery Networks (with Athena I. Vakali and Mukaddim Pathan, Springer, 2008).

In 2017, Buyya won the Scopus Excellence in Innovative Research Award.

In 2021, Buyya was included in a list of 40 researchers regarded as lifetime achievers in their fields published by The Australian.

References

External links

Fellow Members of the IEEE
Australian computer scientists
Living people
Year of birth missing (living people)
Place of birth missing (living people)